Passerina is both a rare local white grape that is found in the Marche, in Italy and a DOC for wines of the same name. Many researchers have studied its identity, so to boast an extensive bibliography and a high number of citations of the grapes on the most famous treatises of ampelography. However, its origins remain uncertain. Known by various names such as "Pagadebito Gentile", "Campolese" and "Uva Passera", the term "Passerina" is attributed to those grapes that have small berries often devoid of seeds. Passerina is used in some Marche wine blends, including the DOC Falerio dei Colli Ascolani.

Grape Qualities
Passerina has large berries, high yields and a long ripening period.  It makes appealing wines with clear, focused fruit.

References

White wine grape varieties
Wine grapes of Italy